Nothing Technology Limited (stylised as NOTHING) is a consumer electronics manufacturer based in London, England. It was founded by Carl Pei, the co-founder of Chinese smartphone maker OnePlus. Investors in the company include iPod inventor Tony Fadell, Twitch co-founder Kevin Lin, Reddit CEO Steve Huffman, and YouTuber Casey Neistat. On 25 February 2021, the company announced Teenage Engineering as a founding partner, mainly responsible for the brand's design aesthetic and its products. Nothing's first product "ear (1)" was launched on 27 July 2021.

History
On 16 October 2020, Carl Pei, the co-founder of OnePlus, while working at OnePlus alongside Pete Lau, announced his resignation so that he could start a new venture. Pei later raised up to $7 million from multiple investors to start up his venture including iPod inventor Tony Fadell, Twitch co-founder Kevin Lin, Reddit CEO Steve Huffman, and YouTuber Casey Neistat.

Pei announced the company, Nothing, on 27 January 2021.

On 15 February 2021, Nothing acquired the Essential Products trademarks and brand nearly a year after the company shut down operations.

On 25 February 2021, the company announced its first founding partner, Teenage Engineering, to produce the design aesthetic of the brand and its products.

Nothing announced its first product on 27 July 2021, named the "ear (1)", which are wireless headphones.

On 13 October 2021, the company raised up to $50 million and also announced a partnership with Qualcomm.

On 9 March 2022, the same day that Nothing secured Series B financing, the company announced that it would hold a press conference on 23 March. During that event, the company announced its first smartphone, the "phone (1)".

On 10 December 2022, Nothing opened its first physical store in London's Soho district.

In February 2023, during the Mobile World Congress (MWC) in Barcelona Nothing announced that their next generation of phones will be powered by the Snapdragon 8 Gen 1. The announcement highlighted the increased power and device price of the next smartphone release.

Investment

Products

Ear (1)

The Nothing Ear 1, stylised as the "ear (1)", is Nothing's first product. Announced on 27 July 2021, the Ear 1 is a set of wireless earbuds. The earbuds can be connected by Bluetooth and have up to 34 hours of battery life when used with the charging case, and up to 5.7 hours of battery life with ANC off; with 24 hours with the case used and up to four hours for the earbuds themselves with ANC on. The earbuds went on sale on 17 August 2021, at $99/£99/€99.

A Black version was also announced on 6 December 2021, and went on sale on 13 December. Nothing also announced on that day that the Ear 1 earbuds are now carbon neutral.

On 18 October 2022, Nothing's CEO Carl Pei announced on Twitter that the Ear 1's price will be increased to $149 starting on 26 October 2022 due to an increase in costs.

Phone (1)

On 23 March 2022, Nothing announced its first smartphone named the "Phone (1)". 

The phone runs on an Android-based operating system named Nothing OS and went on sale on 21 July 2022.

In June 2022, Nothing opened an invite-only pre-order for the "Phone (1)", which reached up to 100,000 registrations on the waiting list. The device, which was unveiled on 12 July in London, features a Qualcomm Snapdragon 778G+ chipset and transparent design.

Ear (stick)
Ear (stick) is a pair of earbuds Nothing released on November 4th, 2022. It is the second part of the Ear family and a lower tier version of Ear (1), and does not include noise cancellation, transparency mode, or wireless charging. Ear (stick) launched at a price of $99.

Ear (2) 
In March 2023, Nothing announced the release of their second-generation earbuds, the Nothing Ear (2). This new earphone is said to support the LHDC 5.0 low latency HD audio codec and will come equipped with 11.6 mm speakers, similar to its predecessor. The earbuds are scheduled to be launched or released on March 22, 2023.

References

External links
 

Nothing Technology
Technology companies based in London
British companies established in 2020
Electronics companies established in 2020